Sinclair Ntomuchukwu Armstrong (born 22 June 2003) is an Irish professional footballer who plays as a forward for Championship club Queens Park Rangers.

Club career

Early career
Initially starting his career with Cherry Orchard, Armstrong went onto sign for Shamrock Rovers, featuring for their underage sides before making his senior debut, aged 15, in August 2018 in a 1–0 loss to Drogheda United in the FAI Cup. He made 6 appearances for the club's reserve side Shamrock Rovers II in the League of Ireland First Division in 2020.

Queens Park Rangers
In late 2020, he made the move to Championship side Queens Park Rangers, following a successful trial period with the club. 

On 18 October 2021, he earned his first loan move, joining National League club Torquay United until January 2022. Just five days later, he went onto score on his debut, netting the opener in their 2–0 home victory over King's Lynn Town. Armstrong went onto feature eight more times for The Gulls, adding another to his tally against Weymouth in December before returning to West London. In April 2022, he returned to the National League, this time joining Aldershot Town on loan for the remainder of the campaign. On 26 April 2022, Armstrong made his debut against Bromley, before days later scoring his first goal for the club during a 3–1 home victory over Notts County.

After an impactful pre-season ahead of the 2022–23 campaign, Armstrong was named in Queens Park Rangers' matchday squad for their first game of the season against Blackburn Rovers, in which he made his eventful debut featuring for the final 13 minutes in the 1–0 defeat.

International career
Armstrong has been capped at both under-17 and under-19 level for Republic of Ireland.

Career statistics

References

External links

2003 births
Living people
Association footballers from Dublin (city)
Republic of Ireland association footballers
Republic of Ireland youth international footballers
Irish people of Nigerian descent
Irish sportspeople of African descent
Irish expatriate sportspeople in England
Black Irish sportspeople
Association football forwards
Cherry Orchard F.C. players
Shamrock Rovers F.C. players
Queens Park Rangers F.C. players
Torquay United F.C. players
Aldershot Town F.C. players
National League (English football) players
English Football League players